Joe Salisbury and Neal Skupski were the defending champions, but Skupski chose to compete in Basel instead. 

Salisbury played alongside Rajeev Ram and successfully defended the title, defeating Łukasz Kubot and Marcelo Melo in the final, 6–4, 6–7(5–7), [10–5].

Seeds

Draw

Draw

Qualifying

Seeds

Qualifiers
  Luke Bambridge /  Ben McLachlan

Lucky losers
  Frederik Nielsen /  Tim Pütz

Qualifying draw

References

External links
 Main draw
 Qualifying draw

Erste Bank Open - Doubles
Vienna Open